Cheshmeh Chai-ye Sofla (also Romanized as Cheshmeh Chāī-ye Soflá; also known as Cheshmeh Chāhī-ye Soflá) is a village in Karezan Rural District, Karezan District, Sirvan County, Ilam Province, Iran. At the 2006 census, its population was 87, in 20 families. The village is populated by Kurds.

References 

Populated places in Sirvan County
Kurdish settlements in Ilam Province